CASIC WJ is a series of unmanned aerial vehicles (UAVs) developed by the 3rd Academy Hiwing (HW for short) of the China Aerospace Science and Industry Corporation (CASIC), and the academy is also more commonly known as HiWING Mechanical and Electrical Technology Corp., or HiWING for short.

WJ-010
WJ-010 UAV is a development of the unarmed CASIC HW-100 Sparrowhawk, and the two UAVs share the identical layout. As an armed version, WJ-010 utilizes modular design concept to enable the rapid replacement two different kinds of payload: the first payload is the optical payload for reconnaissance, and with this payload, WJ-010 functions as an ordinary scout UAV. The second payload is a warhead, and when armed with this payload, WJ-010 functions as a suicide attack UAV.

WJ-100 Blade
WJ-100 Blade (Dao-Feng or Daofeng, 刀锋) is the latest model (as of early of 2015) of Blade series UAV developed by CASIC, which includes several other models such as CASIC HW-300 and CASIC SF-460. As with other member of Blade series UAV, WJ-100 is also in twin boom layout with high wing configuration and tricycle landing gear. The winglets of WJ-100 is larger in comparison to some earlier model of Blade series. Propulsion is provided by a two-blade propeller driven pusher engine mounted at the rear end of the fuselage.

WJ-500
WJ-500 is a jet powered UAV developed by CASIC intended for various missions, such as targeting, reconnaissance, target damage assessment, and simulation of cruise missiles and aircraft. WJ-500 has a cylindrical fuselage with inlet atop the empennage. Wing tip tank can be installed on the main wing. WJ-500 made its public debut in November 2014 at the 10th Zhuhai Airshow.

WJ-600 A/D
WJ-600 A/D is a development of CASIC HW-610 and CASIC HW-600 Sky Hawk (WJ-600), and in comparison to its predecessors that is either a reconnaissance only version or a ground attack only version, WJ-600 A/D incorporates both the reconnaissance and ground attack capability so that it can perform both missions, and hence A/D in its name stands for attack drone. WJ-600 A/D is designed to carry out both the reconnaissance mission of WJ-600 and the ground attack mission of HW-610 in a single platform. Specification:
Endurance (hr): 5
Speed (km/hr): 850
Propulsion: turbofan

On 27 October 2016, two WJ-600A/Ds were spotted in a military parade in Turkmenistan, the first confirmed export.

WJ-700
At the 2018 Zhuhai Airshow, CASIC unveiled a medium-/high-altitude long-endurance (MALE/HALE) armed reconnaissance unmanned aerial vehicle named WJ-700 with a maximum takeoff weight (MTOW) of 3,500 kg and an endurance of up to 20 hours. It has four underwing hardpoints and can carry CM-102 anti-radiation missile, C-701, and C-705KD anti-ship missiles, but also land attack munition.
In July 2022, Algeria purchased four, in response to Morocco's purchase of 13 Baykar Bayraktar TB2s in 2019.

See also

References

Unmanned aerial vehicles of China